The following list of Carnegie libraries in California provides detailed information on United States Carnegie libraries in California, where 142 public libraries were built from 121 grants (totaling $2,779,487) awarded by the Carnegie Corporation of New York from 1899 to 1917. In addition, academic libraries were built at two institutions (totaling $60,000).

Key

Public libraries

Academic libraries

Notes

References 
 
 
 
 
Note: The above references, while all authoritative, are not entirely mutually consistent. Some details of this list may have been drawn from one of the references (usually Jones) without support from the others.  Reader discretion is advised.

External links 
 Carnegie Libraries of California

 
California
Libraries
Carnegie Libraries
Carnegie Libraries
Carnegie libraries